Julie Erikssen, is a French jazz singer and songwriter who gained fame in 2002 with the song "Dans ce monde" which she followed by another hit in 2004 titled "Entre l'ombre et la lumière" by the name of "Jody", before she started jazz.

In The voice, la plus belle voix
In 2014, she resurfaced as a contestant on the third season of the French music contest The Voice: la plus belle voix on TF1, in which she auditioned with the Mika song "Underwater" with two of the four judges, Florent Pagny and Jenifer turned their chairs, although Mika, who was also a judge did not turn his chair. She opted to be on Team Florent. In the battle round, she was ousted in competition with Alexia Rabé after both sang "Tout" from Lara Fabian. Although Jenifer stole her for a second round, but she failed to proceed further than round 2 of the live shows.

Performances during the show
Blind Audition – "Underwater" from Mika (in Team Florent Pagny)
Battle round – "Tout" from Lara Fabian (lost battle against Alexia Rabé. Stolen by Jenifer to be in her team)
L'épreuve ultime round – "Stop!" from Sam Brown (against Team Jenifer members Ginie Line, Emma Shaka – Eliminated)
   
After the contest, she announced she was releasing her EP Breathe online.

Discography

Albums
 Julie Erikssen – "Out Of Chaos"
Format : CD /
Date de sortie : 2 février 2018 /
Label: Soundsurveyor /
ASIN : B078HXJJTB.

EPs
as Julie Erikssen
2014: Breathe EP

Singles 
As Jody

References

External links
Facebook

Living people
The Voice (franchise) contestants
Year of birth missing (living people)
21st-century French women singers